Wizard's Hall is a 1991 fantasy novel by Jane Yolen. The Harry Potter series, which began publishing six years later, has many similarities. However, Yolen believes the similarities are coincidental.

Characters and story
The mother of shy Henry sends him to Wizard's Hall where he can train to become a wizard. At the Hall he is renamed Thornmallow, suggesting that he is prickly on the outside yet soft inside. He becomes quite conspicuous as he covers a classroom in snow, yells during an orientation speech and has other embarrassing moments. He soon learns that he is one of 113 students who are being prepared to confront the evil wizard Nettle and his huge Beast. Thornmallow feels he may not be equal to the challenge.

References

See also 
 Kaytek the Wizard

1991 American novels
1991 children's books
Children's fantasy novels
American fantasy novels
American children's novels
Novels by Jane Yolen
Fictional magic schools
Wizards in fiction